Lefevrea atromaculata is a species of leaf beetle of the Democratic Republic of the Congo, Uganda and Ivory Coast. It was first described by the British entomologist Gilbert Ernest Bryant in 1932, from specimens collected by the British entomologist Alfred Francis John Gedye from Kampala, Uganda.

References 

Eumolpinae
Beetles of Africa
Beetles of the Democratic Republic of the Congo
Insects of Uganda
Insects of West Africa
Beetles described in 1932